T. V. Reed is the Buchanan Distinguished Professor Emeritus of American Studies and English at Washington State University.  Reed's scholarship and teaching centers on the politics of cultural forms, and cultural forms of politics, particularly as rooted in social movements. His work has analyzed a wide variety of texts, from literature to film to the World Wide Web to university departments to movements themselves as texts, within a timeframe from the 1930s to the present. This work has included not only the fairly common cultural studies approach of examining the ways in which social trends can be read symptomatically in literature and other cultural forms, but also the equally important, less practiced task of analyzing how cultural forms themselves directly contribute to and are shaped by social movements.

Early life and education 
Reed grew up in the San Francisco Bay Area, did undergraduate work and Master's work in the Northwest, and received his PhD at the History of Consciousness Program at the University of California, Santa Cruz. There he took graduate seminars from Michel Foucault, Donna Haraway, James Clifford, Gayatri Spivak, Edward Said, Fredric Jameson, Henri Lefebrve, and Hayden White, among others. Reed claims that experience, in addition to “instilling some particular theoretical approaches, taught him two important lessons: (1) even the most celebrated theorists are just flawed human beings with embodied intellectual limits like the rest of us; and (2) the best theorists do not fetishize their own theories but are rather in a constant state of evolution and self-questioning.”

Works

Website 
Reed is the author/manager of a website, Cultural Politics, that includes pages on digital cultures, environmental justice cultural studies, popular culture, social movement cultures, and interdisciplinary cultural theory,

Books 
Reed has four published books that approach the terrain of cultural politics in differing but related ways. Fifteen Jugglers, Five Believers: Literary Politics and the Poetics of American Social Movements (University of California Press, 1992) enters a long-standing debate between those scholars and critics who seek to reduce literature and art to a wholly self-contained realm above politics and ideology, and those who seek to portray literature as simply reflecting ideological positions. Reed takes a position that mediates between these schools of thought by arguing that while literature is political, it is political in unique ways that cannot be reduced to and can in fact be used to resist reductive ideological positions. Reed calls the strategy that emerges from the political and critical positions he takes "postmodernist realism." This names at once a mode of writing and a mode of reading, one that features self-reflexive, realism-disrupting techniques found in postmodernist fiction but places those techniques in tension with "real" cognitive claims and with "realistic," radically pragmatic political needs. Reed argues for a "postmodern populism" that acknowledges the contingent nature of truth claims but roots those claims in situated knowledges reflecting unequal power positions that must be changed to allow for truly democratic political contestation. In this light, he shows how schools of critical thought such as neo-Marxisms, feminisms, critical race theories and new historicisms, among others, can be most effective when set in pragmatic relation to actually existing social movements.

Reed's book The Art of Protest: Culture and Activism from the Civil Rights Movement to the Streets of Seattle (University of Minnesota Press, 2005; revised edition 2019), was conceived as the second of a two-volume project. While his first book examined certain ideological analogies between literary texts and social movements, Art of Protest looks directly at cultural texts produced in and for particular social movements, from the 1950s to the present. It looks, for example, at the transformation of spirituals into movement “freedom songs” in the struggle for African American Civil Rights, the use of murals by the Chicano/a movement, drama in the Black Power movement, poetry in the women's movement, cinematic representation of the American Indian Movement, graphic arts in AIDS activism, and new media arts in the movement against corporate globalization. Each of nine chapters examines the particular contributions a different cultural form can offer to social change, analyzes the way in which cultural forms shape social movements, and traces the diffusion of movement texts out into the wider society.

Where Art of Protest concentrated in its examples on the period of US social movements in international contexts since the 1950s, Reed's third book, Robert Cantwell and the Literary Left: A Northwest Writer Reworks American Fiction (University of Washington Press, 2014) moves back into an earlier decade to pursue a related set of questions about politics and literature. A critical-cultural study of radical novelist Robert Cantwell's career in the 1930s, the book serves as a case study for rethinking the "proletarian" or left literary movement of the Depression years. The book seeks to get beyond the heroic white male worker archetype, instead situating this largely Marxist literary movement in the larger raced, gendered and sexed context of what Reed, building on Michael Denning, calls “the reworking of US literatures.”  Without denying certain formulaic ideological dimensions in some leftist works of the era, and the dominance at some points of images of a heroic white male proletarian, the book argues that we still have not come out from under Cold War-influenced caricatures of this literary era. Reed argues that the conservative critics of radical thirties literature have actually offered far more ideologically reductive readings than have the texts they criticize. The book demonstrates how misreadings of the 1930s continue to suppress a nuanced class component of intersectional cultural analyses that deal more thoughtfully with race, gender, sexuality and other categories of social difference. He further argues that denigration of 1930s working class-centric cultural texts continues to inhibit serious understanding of economic classes in US social movement contestation, a fact that accounts in part for the limited longevity of the Occupy Wall Street Movement.

Reed's book,  Digitized Lives: Culture, Power and Social Change in the Internet Era (Routledge, 2014; revised edition 2019) in effect carries questions of cultural politics into the future by examining the various dimensions of social life being transformed by new digital media. Reed examines both the process of digital culture production—from design to manufacture to marketing—as well as such key arenas as politics, education, social identity (gender, race/ethnicity, sexuality, dis/ability) and various digital divides. Rejecting both cyber-utopianism, and cyber-apocalypticism, Digitized Lives argues that new cultural technologies have great negative and positive potential, and that only an active, engaged citizenry, not some techno-fix, can shape the digital landscape toward greater social justice.

Essays 
Reed has also published essays dealing with additional dimensions of US political cultures, including the cultures of academe and academic theory in a variety of venues such as Representations, American Literary History, The Encyclopedia of American Studies and American Studies International.  His articles on the politically innovative narrative strategies of James Agee and E.L. Doctorow have appeared in Representations and American Literary History, respectively. He is the author of the bibliographic essay, "Theory and Method in American Cultural Studies," appearing originally in American Studies International, and now also available in a much-expanded online version at his web matrix, Cultural Politics.

Reed has also published articles on apartheid and popular music, on Native radicals in film, on environmental justice ecocriticism, and in the area of interdisciplinary peace studies, among other topics. Reed's interest in institutional-theoretical questions of interdisciplinarity is reflected in a piece published in the anthology, Color-Lines to Border Lands, that examines a phenomenon he calls “the intersection of interdisciplines.” The essay theorizes and historicizes interrelations among the fields of ethnic studies, women's studies, queer studies, postcolonial studies and American studies, and relates them to shifting social movement landscapes.

Awards 
Among other honors, Reed has been a Fulbright Senior Lecturer at the JFK Institute for North American Studies in Berlin, Germany, a Mellon Fellow at Wesleyan University, a visiting scholar at the Center for Cultural Studies of the University of California, Santa Cruz, and distinguished visiting scholar and keynote speaker for the University of Kansas Institute for Rethinking Literature. In 2013, he was awarded the American Studies Association's Mary C. Turpie Award for “outstanding teaching, advising and program development”. Reed was visiting professor of English and humanities at York University, Toronto, from 2013-2017.

Additional activities 
Reed was co-chair of the national American Studies Association's conference for 2002, has been a member of the ASA's national council and was one of two nominees for the organization's presidency in 2011. In 2011, Reed received the Mary C. Turpie award of the American Studies Association for "outstanding achievement in American studies teaching, advising and program development. He has long worked for the internationalization of American Studies, the effort to undercut the ethnocentrism still found in the field, and has been involved in projects with universities in Germany, Ukraine, Morocco, the People's Republic of China, and Japan.
 and also a published author, largely collected in libraries.

External links 
 Cultural Politics Website
 Fifteen Jugglers, Five Believers: Literary Politics and the Poetics of American Social Movements (University of California Press, 1992)
 The Art of Protest: Culture and Activism from the Civil Rights Movement to the Streets of Seattle (University of Minnesota Press, 2005;2019)
 Digitized Lives: Culture, Power and Social Change in the Internet Era (Routledge, 2014; 2019)
 Robert Cantwell and the Literary Left: A Northwest Writer Reworks American Fiction (University of Washington Press, 2014)

References

Living people
21st-century American historians
21st-century American male writers
Washington State University faculty
Year of birth missing (living people)
American male non-fiction writers